Mohammad Ebadot Hossain Mondal ( – 22 December 2019) was a Bangladeshi  politician from Jhenaidah. He was elected Member of Parliament for BNP from Jessore-3 Constituency in 1979 in the Second National Parliament Election. He was a member of the Parliamentary Standing Committee of the Ministry of Industries.

Biography
Mondal was born in 1939 in the village of Natopara of Kaliganj of Jhenaidah. He was elected as a member of Jatiya Sangsad from Jessore-3 in 1979 as a Bangladesh Nationalist Party candidate. Later, he joined Jatiya Party in 1990.

Mondal died on 22 December 2019 in Jhenaidah Sadar Hospital at the age of 80.

References

People from Jhenaidah District
1939 births
2nd Jatiya Sangsad members
2019 deaths
Jatiya Party politicians
Bangladesh Nationalist Party politicians